The following is List of Universities and Colleges in Inner Mongolia.

Note: The list is arranged in the default order followed the one provided by MOE

References
List of Chinese Higher Education Institutions — Ministry of Education
List of Chinese universities, including official links
Inner Mongolia Institutions Admitting International Students

 
Mongolia, Inner